Live at the Lower Manhattan Ocean Club is a live album by David Murray. It was originally released as two volumes on the India Navigation label in 1978 and re-released in 1989 on a single CD (with a slightly edited final track). It features a live performance by Murray, trumpeter Lester Bowie, bassist  Fred Hopkins and drummer Phillip Wilson recorded in concert at the Lower Manhattan Ocean Club, NYC.

Reception
The Rolling Stone Jazz Record Guide  called the first volume of Live at the Lower Manhattan Ocean Club "an epoch-stretching quartet set".
The Allmusic review by Scott Yanow awarded the album 3 stars, stating, "This double CD, which packages together the two original LPs, captures David Murray's quartet (trumpeter Lester Bowie, bassist Fred Hopkins and drummer Phillip Wilson) in high spirits. The six selections (four are over ten minutes and "For Walter Norris" exceeds 21) are full of spirit, looseness, humor, screams and screeches. Some of it rambles on too long (and Murray's soprano on "Bechet's Bounce" is quite silly) but it generally holds on to one's attention.".

Track listing
 "Nevada's Theme" - 11:15
 "Bechet's Bounce" - 7:37
 "Obe" (Morris) - 18:12
 "Let the Music Take You" - 3:36
 "For Walter Norris" (Morris) - 21:16
 "Santa Barbara and Crenshaw Follies" - 12:20

All compositions by David Murray except as indicated
Recorded in concert at the Lower Manhattan Ocean Club, NYC, December 31, 1977

Personnel
David Murray - tenor saxophone, bass clarinet on 2
Lester Bowie - trumpet
Fred Hopkins - bass
Phillip Wilson - drums

References 

1978 live albums
David Murray (saxophonist) live albums
India Navigation live albums